Thomas Wallace House is a historic home located at Petersburg, Virginia. It was built about 1855, and is a two-story, three-bay, pressed brick dwelling in the Italianate style. It sits on a raised basement and has a low hipped roof with bracketed cornice.  It has a one-story rear service wing and a front porch supported by six fluted Greek Doric order columns.  On April 3, 1865, President Abraham Lincoln and General Ulysses S. Grant met in its library to discuss the inevitable end to the American Civil War and the surrender.

It was listed on the National Register of Historic Places in 1975.  It is located in the South Market Street Historic District. It is located 204 South Market, Petersburg.

References

Houses on the National Register of Historic Places in Virginia
Italianate architecture in Virginia
Houses completed in 1855
Houses in Petersburg, Virginia
National Register of Historic Places in Petersburg, Virginia
Individually listed contributing properties to historic districts on the National Register in Virginia